The Everly Brothers' Best is the first compilation album by American singing duo the Everly Brothers, released in 1959 by their first record company, Cadence Records. The album contains both sides of their first six singles for the label in chronological order.
Allmusic states in their review: "this original Cadence compilation still holds up nicely after almost half-a-century."

Track listing

Side 1
"Bye Bye Love" (Felice Bryant, Boudleaux Bryant) – 2:26
"I Wonder If I Care as Much" (Don Everly) – 2:17
"Wake Up Little Susie" (F. Bryant, B. Bryant) – 2:06
"Maybe Tomorrow" (Everly) – 2:09
"Should We Tell Him" (Everly) – 2:07
"This Little Girl of Mine" (Ray Charles) – 2:17

Side 2
"All I Have to Do is Dream" (Boudleaux Bryant) – 2:21
"Claudette" (Roy Orbison) – 2:13
"Bird Dog" (B. Bryant) – 2:17
"Devoted to You" (F. Bryant, B. Bryant) – 2:25
"Problems" (F. Bryant, B. Bryant) – 1:59
"Love of My Life" (F. Bryant, B. Bryant) – 2:07

Produced by Archie Bleyer

Personnel
Don Everly – guitar, vocals
Phil Everly – guitar, vocals
Chet Atkins – guitar
Jerry Allison – guitar, drums
Victor Battista – bass
Luther Brandon – piano
Floyd Cramer – piano
Floyd Chance – double bass on “Bye Bye Love”, Wake Up Little Susie”, “All I Have To Do Is Dream”, and “Bird Dog”
Jerry Byrd – steel guitar
Howard Collins – guitar
Ray Edenton – guitar
Lloyd Trotman – bass
Henry Rowland – piano
Sonny Curtis – guitar
Barry Galbraith – guitar
Hank Garland – guitar
Marvin Hughes – piano
Buddy Harman – drums
Mundell Lowe – guitar

References

The Everly Brothers compilation albums
1959 greatest hits albums
Cadence Records compilation albums